The 1828 United States presidential election in Rhode Island took place between October 31 and December 2, 1828, as part of the 1828 United States presidential election. Voters chose four representatives, or electors to the Electoral College, who voted for President and Vice President.

Rhode Island voted for the National Republican candidate, John Quincy Adams, over the Democratic candidate, Andrew Jackson. Adams won Rhode Island by a margin of 54.06%.

With 77.03% of the popular vote, Adams' victory in Rhode Island made it his strongest state in the 1828 election.

Results

See also
 United States presidential elections in Rhode Island

References

Rhode Island
1828
1828 Rhode Island elections